Maja Blagdan (born 16 May 1968) is a Croatian pop singer. She began her singing career in a rock band, Stijene, in 1986. Later she had a solo career. Her first solo album was released in 1993.

She represented Croatia at the Eurovision Song Contest 1996 held in Oslo. Her song "Sveta ljubav" (Holy Love) finished 4th with 98 points.

Sources
 https://web.archive.org/web/20140929174051/http://www.hrt.hr/dora_arhiva/dora2003/biografije/blagdan.html 

1968 births
Living people
Musicians from Split, Croatia
20th-century Croatian women singers
Croatian pop singers
Eurovision Song Contest entrants for Croatia
Eurovision Song Contest entrants of 1996